Blackest Hair, Bluest Eyes, released 2004, is the first commercial release by musician Chris Staples, previously of Twothirtyeight. Staples previously independently recorded the acoustic albums Panama, and Burned and Blistered, which this album draws many of the tracks from.

Track listing
 "Something To Break"
 "American"
 "Burned and Blistered"
 "Blackest Hair, Bluest Eyes"
 "Cars Are Overrated"
 "Fall Back On Old Friends"
 "Hot Hot Summer Night"
 "If It Makes You Feel Better"
 "Letter From Panama"
 "Everybody Has A Middle Name"

2004 albums
Makebreak Records albums